Airmadidi is the capital of the North Minahasa Regency, North Sulawesi, Indonesia. Airmadidi is home to Universitas Klabat (Klabat University). There is also a well known Airmadidi market.

Airmadidi means boiling water and the area is home to mineral springs. There are also waruga sarcophagi in the area.

Demographics
The Airmadidi subdistrict has an estimated population of 26,178 in 2017.

People
The Minahasan politician Antoinette Waroh was born here in 1901.

Administrative Division
This district is divided into 9 villages:
 Airmadidi Atas
 Airmadidi Bawah
 Sarongsong I
 Sarongsong II
 Rap-rap
 Sukur
 Sawangan (Village)
 Tanggari (Village)
 Sampiri (Village)

Mass media
KWAM-TV (LPPL North Minahasa Regency) Closed on September 19, 2012 (This name is taken from the name of a television station in the United States) Operates as North Minahasa Regency Government on April 17, 2004.
This Television Station Was The First Local Public Broadcasting Institution In North Sulawesi From 2004 Until It Stopped Operating In 2012. Abbreviated (Kawanua Waruga Air Madidi - Televisi). Pioneer this means that the of the first local public broadcasting institution in North Sulawesi names is taken from a television station in the United States but a television station in North Minahasa, North Sulawesi, Indonesia.

Climate
Airmadidi has a tropical rainforest climate (Af) with heavy to very heavy rainfall year-round.

Transport
Airmadidi is connected to the nearby cities of Manado and Bitung through an exit at the Manado-Bitung Toll Road. It is also served by a number of angkot public transport routes.

References

Populated places in North Sulawesi
Regency seats of North Sulawesi